, known professionally as K Dub Shine, is a Japanese rapper.

Early life

Kagami was born in the Shibuya ward of the city of Tokyo, Japan. In 10th grade K Dub Shine enrolled in an exchange program which landed him in Philadelphia.  It was in Philly that he first encountered hip hop.  He was immediately attracted to the way in which it addressed social inequality in the United States. It was in college that Shine began writing his own raps, first in English and later in Japanese.

Career

By the late 1990s, K Dub Shine had created his own record label and had become a big force in the Japanese underground hip hop scene.  Many of his lyrics seek to depict accurately and without bias the reality of Japanese youth culture.

External links
 K DUB SHINE Official Site

References

Japanese rappers
1968 births
Musicians from Shibuya
Living people